James Somerville (born circa 1900) was a Scottish footballer who played as an outside left, most prominently for Airdrieonians, where he won the Scottish Cup in 1924 and was an important member of the team as they finished runners-up in the Scottish Football League in four successive seasons. He also played for all three of his local senior clubs: Falkirk East Stirlingshire, and Stenhousemuir.

References

Year of death missing
Scottish footballers
Footballers from Falkirk (council area)
People from Stenhousemuir
East Stirlingshire F.C. players
Falkirk F.C. players
Stenhousemuir F.C. players
Airdrieonians F.C. (1878) players
Scottish Football League players
Association football outside forwards
Year of birth uncertain